Darren Stein (born December 24, 1971) is an American film director, screenwriter, and film producer who grew up in the San Fernando Valley. Among his works include the documentary Put the Camera on Me, the 2010 horror comedy All About Evil, and the satirical major motion picture Jawbreaker - which was deemed a "cult classic" by the New York Post, and is still referenced today in mainstream sources.

Career
Stein started using his father's video camera at the age of ten, creating a body of work that would later be seen in his documentary Put the Camera on Me.  Upon graduating NYU film school, he co-wrote and directed his first feature, Sparkler, that premiered at the Hamptons Film Festival and won the audience award in Athens, GA.  Stein's second feature, Jawbreaker, premiered at the 1999 Sundance Film Festival and was nominated for the MTV Movie Award for “Best Villain”.  Upon completing Put the Camera on Me with childhood friend Adam Shell in 2003, Stein was interviewed by Ira Glass on This American Life. The documentary was released on DVD through Wellspring/Genius Entertainment.  Stein went on to executive produce Cam Archer’s Wild Tigers I Have Known, which premiered at the 2005 Sundance Film Festival. In 2010, he produced All About Evil, a horror comedy starring Natasha Lyonne and Thomas Dekker.  Most recently, he has written the book for Jawbreaker the Musical, which is scheduled for a one night showing on July 29, 2010, in Los Angeles, and featuring Jenna Leigh Green.

Personal life
Stein is openly gay.

Filmography

References

External links

Darren Stein on Myspace

1971 births
American film directors
American film producers
English-language film directors
Living people
American male screenwriters
Place of birth missing (living people)
American gay writers
LGBT film directors
21st-century American LGBT people